Panicos Chrysanthou (Greek: Πανίκος Χρυσάνθου; born in 1951 in Kythrea, Cyprus) is a Cypriot filmmaker and documentarian, who has won the Abdi İpekçi Peace Award for his film Our Wall.

Biography 
Panicos Chrysanthou graduated from the University of Athens with a joint degree in literature and philosophy. He worked as an assistant director and executive producer in Greek and Cypriot films before beginning to make his own films.

He received the prestigious Abdi İpekçi Peace Award in 1997 for his film, Our Wall.

Filmography

References

External links 
 

Living people
Cypriot film directors
National and Kapodistrian University of Athens alumni
1951 births
People from Nicosia District